The Espíritu Santo River is a Bolivian river in the Cochabamba Department, Chapare Province, Villa Tunari Municipality. It belongs to the Amazon River watershed. Espíritu Santo River originates in the Callejas mountains south west of Villa Tunari. At first it flows in a northeasterly direction, then it turns to the east towards Villa Tunari. In the east of the town it meets San Matéo River which comes from the south west. From the confluence the river is known as Chapare River.

See also
List of rivers of Bolivia

References 

 lib.utexas.edu Detailed map of the area
 Rand McNally, The New International Atlas, 1993.

External links
 

Rivers of Cochabamba Department